The Lutheran Gustav Adolf Stave Church is a stave church situated in Hahnenklee, a borough of Goslar in the Harz mountains, Germany. Construction of the church began in 1907 and it was consecrated on 28 June 1908.

The church is a copy of the medieval Borgund Stave Church in Norway. It was erected during the sudden rise in Hahnenklee's popularity as a spa town and major tourist destination, with adaptions to fulfil its role as a parish church. The plans were designed by Karl Mohrmann (1857–1927), architect of the Evangelical-Lutheran Church of Hanover, a representative of the historicist Hanover school of architecture. He had visited Borgund and held the view that stave churches once were common in the medieval Saxon areas too.

The church was built from spruce trunks harvested at the nearby Bocksberg mountain. The interior comprises numerous carvings of archaic symbols as well as Viking ship design features. The building soon became a frequently visited landmark and a popular wedding church.

External links 

  

Buildings and structures in Goslar (district)
Churches completed in 1908
20th-century Lutheran churches
Landmarks in Germany
Goslar GustavusAdolphusChurch
Abbeys and churches in the Harz
Replicas of stave churches
Goslar GustavusAdolphusChurch